Actinocyclus papillatus is a species of sea slug or dorid nudibranch, a marine gastropod mollusk in the family Actinocyclidae.

Distribution 
Actinocyclus papillatus is found in the tropical Western Indo-Pacific Ocean.

Description
This nudibranch grows up to 100 mm in length.

Ecology

References

External links

Chromodorididae
Gastropods described in 1878